Langya District is a district of Anhui Province, China. It is under the administration of Chuzhou city.

Administrative divisions
Langya District is divided to 8 subdistricts:
8 Subdistricts

References

Chuzhou